This is a complete list of players who have played for Dinamo Riga of the Kontinental Hockey League.



A 
Jānis Andersons,
Ģirts Ankipāns,
Tyler Arnason,
Uģis Avotiņš

B 
Armands Bērziņš,
Māris Bičevskis,
Elvijs Biezais,
Viktors Bļinovs,
Edijs Brahmanis,
Roberts Bukarts

C 
Mathieu Carle,
Oskars Cibuļskis,
Ronalds Cinks,
Aigars Cipruss,
Mārtiņš Cipulis

D 
Lauris Dārziņš,
Kaspars Daugaviņš,
Andris Džeriņš

E 
Matt Ellison

F 
Adrian Foster

G 
Guntis Galviņš,
Alexandre Giroux,
Kristers Gudļevskis

H 
Mark Hartigan,
Toms Hartmanis,
Chris Holt,
Marcel Hossa

I 
Mike Iggulden,
Miks Indrašis,
Raitis Ivanāns

J 
Jamie Johnson,
Māris Jučers

K 
Vitaly Karamnov,
Martin Kariya,
Mārtiņš Karsums

L 
Rodrigo Laviņš,
Miks Lipsbergs,
Niclas Lucenius,
Jamie Lundmark,
Edgars Lūsiņš

M 
Edgars Masaļskis,
Gints Meija,
Björn Melin,
Juraj Mikúš,
Ervīns Muštukovs

N 
Sergejs Naumovs,
Ville Nieminen,
Aleksandrs Ņiživijs,
Filip Novák

O 
Sandis Ozoliņš

P 
Vitālijs Pavlovs,
Sergejs Pečura,
Róbert Petrovický,
Ronald Petrovický,
Ainārs Podziņš,
Mārtiņš Porejs,
Martin Prusek,
Georgijs Pujacs

R 
Jēkabs Rēdlihs,
Krišjānis Rēdlihs,
Miķelis Rēdlihs,
Arvīds Reķis

S 
Agris Saviels,
Rob Schremp,
Jakub Šindel,
Aleksejs Širokovs,
Maksims Širokovs,
Gunārs Skvorcovs,
Oļegs Sorokins,
Kristaps Sotnieks,
Daniel Sperrle,
Jānis Sprukts,
Juris Štāls,
Jānis Straupe,
Tomáš Surový,
Lee Sweatt,
Paul Szczechura

T 
Mikael Tellqvist,
Atvars Tribuncovs,
Brock Trotter

U 
Juris Upītis

V 
Raimonds Vilkoits

W 
Fredrik Warg,
Duvie Westcott

Player nationalities 

 
Lists of ice hockey players